Buddhist mummies, also called flesh body bodhisattvas, full body sariras, or living buddhas (Sokushinbutsu) refer to the bodies of Buddhist monks and nuns that remain incorrupt, without any traces of deliberate mummification by another party. Many were destroyed or lost to history. In 2015, the Hungarian Natural History Museum exhibited a Buddhist mummy hidden inside a statue of Buddha, during its first tour outside China.

Methods
It is a common method in China. Some covered the bodies with clay or salt.
According to Victor H. Mair in the Discovery Channel series The Mystery of the Tibetan Mummy, the self-mummification of a Tibetan monk, who died ca. 1475 and whose body was retrieved relatively incorrupt in the 1990s, was achieved by the sophisticated practices of meditation, coupled with prolonged starvation and slow self-suffocation using a special belt that connected the neck with his knees in a lotus position.
Ascetic monks (Sokushinbutsu) in Japan practiced nyūjō (入定), which caused their own death by adhering to a wood-eating diet consisting of salt, nuts, seeds, roots, pine bark, and urushi tea. They were then buried alive in a pine-wood box full of salt connected by a tube for air, and would ring a bell signaling they were alive. When the bell stopped ringing, the air tube would be removed. Japan banned unburying in 1879, and assisted suicide—including religious suicide—is now illegal.

See also
Mummy
List of mummies
Incorruptibility

References

Sources
内藤正敏 (1999/5/10). ミイラ信仰の研究.（京都）法蔵館. 
日本ミイラ研究グループ (1993). 日本・中国ミイラ信仰の研究. 平凡社.

External links
 Justin Ritzinger and Marcus Bingenheimer (2006), Whole-body relics in Chinese Buddhism – Previous Research and Historical Overview
 Stefania Travagnin (2006), SHI CIHANG 航慈釋 THE FIRST CASE OF MUMMIFIED BUDDHIST IN TAIWAN
 Marcus Bingenheimer (2006), Roushen pusa and Corpus Integrum – Whole Body Relics in Buddhism and Christianity.
 Douglas Gildow and Marcus Bingenheimer, Buddhist Mummification in Taiwan: Two Case Studies

Buddhist pilgrimages
Mummies
Buddhist relics